All Men are Equal – But Some are More   is a novel by Sami Michael, published in 1974 by Bustan publishing house. The novel is about the lives of immigrants in transit camps in Israel in the 1950s. This title became a well-known phrase depicting the struggles for equality of Jews from Arab countries and opened the door for profound discussion about the socio-economic gaps in Israel and also about the situation of the Arabs in Israel.

“A credible story which presents, through close observance, a diseased sector of the new Israeli society in the first years of the state. A sector and phenomena very few have dared to review and denominate.”

References

1974 novels
20th-century Israeli novels
Novels set in the 1950s
Novels set in Israel